Minuscule 42 (in the Gregory-Aland numbering), α107 (Von Soden), known as Codex Maedicaeus is a Greek minuscule manuscript of the New Testament on parchment. Palaeographically it has been assigned to the 11th century. 
It has marginalia.

Description 

The codex contains the text of the Acts, Catholic epistles, Paul, Rev, on 303 parchment leaves, with some lacunae (Acts 2:2-34; 2 Pt 1:2; 1 John 5:11-21; Rev 18:3-13). The text is written in one column per page, 22-23 lines per page.

According to F. H. A. Scrivener it is carelessly written.

According to the subscription at the end of the Epistle to the Romans, the Letter was written προς Ρωμαιους εγραφη απο Κορινθου δια Φοιβης της διακονου; the same subscription appears in manuscripts: 90, 216, 339, 462, 466*, 642;

Text 

Kurt Aland the Greek text of the codex did not assigned in any Category.

Its text has some resemblance with minuscule 51 and the Complutensian Polyglot.

According to Scrivener codex "exhibits many readings of the same class as codices 1, 13, 33, but its authority has the less weight".

In Revelation 8:13, it gives the unique reading of "ἀγγέλου ὡς ἀετοῦ" (angel like an eagle).

History 
Currently the manuscrit has been assigned by the INTF to the 11th century.

The codex was used by Ludolph Kuster in edition of Mill's Novum Testamentum in 1710. Mill ascribed it as "exemplar Regium Maedicaeum", and remarked its resemblance to the Codex Angelicus. Nicholas Westermann collated its text. It was quoted by Denis Amelote in his translation of the New Testament.

It was added to the list of the New Testament manuscripts by Wettstein. C. R. Gregory saw it in 1891.

It is currently housed at the Stadtarchiv Frankfurt (Oder) (Gr. 24) at Frankfurt (Oder).

See also 

 List of New Testament minuscules
 Biblical manuscript
 Textual criticism

References

Further reading 

 Heinrich Mideldorf, "Biblischexegetische Repert.", ed. E. F. K. and G. H. Rosenmüller, vol. 2 (Leipzig, 1824), pp. 87–118.
 G. H. Rosenmüller, "Commentatt. theol." vol. 2, pt 2 (Leipzig, 1832), pp. 167–206.
 Franz Delitzsch, Studien zur Entstehung der Polygl.-Bibel des Card. Ximenes, Leipzig 1871, p. 36. 37.
 Herman C. Hoskier, "Concerning the Text of the Apocalypse", vol. 1, pp. 25–27.

External links 

 R. Waltz, Minuscule 42 At the Encyclopedia of Textual Criticism (2007)

Greek New Testament minuscules
11th-century biblical manuscripts